UFC 239: Jones vs. Santos was a mixed martial arts event produced by the Ultimate Fighting Championship that was held on July 6, 2019 at T-Mobile Arena in Paradise, Nevada, part of the Las Vegas Metropolitan Area.

Background
A UFC Light Heavyweight Championship bout between current two-time champion Jon Jones and Thiago Santos served as the event headliner.

A UFC Women's Bantamweight Championship bout between the current champion Amanda Nunes (also current UFC Women's Featherweight Champion) and former champion Holly Holm served as the event co-headliner.

A bout between former UFC Heavyweight title challenger Francis Ngannou and former UFC Heavyweight Champion Junior dos Santos was scheduled to take place at this event. The matchup was originally scheduled to take place in September 2017 at UFC 215, but dos Santos pulled out of that event, citing a failed drug test. However, it was reported on  May 21, that the bout was being moved to headline UFC on ESPN 3 after former UFC Welterweight Champion Tyron Woodley was forced to pull out of his rematch against also former champion Robbie Lawler due to a hand injury.

A featherweight bout between former Strikeforce and WEC Lightweight Champion (as well as former UFC Lightweight Championship challenger) Gilbert Melendez and Arnold Allen headlined the prelims of the event. The matchup was originally scheduled to take place in November 2018 at The Ultimate Fighter: Heavy Hitters Finale, however Melendez pulled out of the fight citing an injury.

A bantamweight bout between The Ultimate Fighter: Latin America bantamweight winner Alejandro Pérez and Song Yadong took place at this event. The matchup was originally scheduled to take place in March 2019 at UFC 235, but Song pulled out of the fight for undisclosed reasons.

Sean O'Malley was expected to face Marlon Vera at the event. However, O'Malley announced his withdrawal from the bout on June 21 due a failed test for ostarine. The Nevada State Athletic Commission decided to suspend him due to the failed test, however the United States Anti Doping Association USADA did not impose any further sanctions.  The ostarine in his system was likely residual from his previously failed test prior to UFC 229. Drako Rodriguez from King of the Cage was offered to replaced O'Malley initially; however the president of the promotion, Terry Trebilcock, refused to release him. Nohelin Hernandez served as the replacement.

Melissa Gatto was scheduled to face Julia Avila at the event. However, Gatto was removed from the card on June 24 for undisclosed reasons and was replaced by returning veteran Pannie Kianzad.

UFC 239 served as the first UFC to air on PPV in the United Kingdom. Following this event select UFC numbered events will now air on BT Sport Box Office in the United Kingdom.

Results

Bonus awards 
The following fighters received $50,000 bonuses:
Fight of the Night: No bonus awarded.
Performance of the Night: Amanda Nunes, Jorge Masvidal, Jan Błachowicz, and Yadong Song

Reported payout 
The following is the reported payout to the fighters as reported to the Nevada State Athletic Commission. It does not include sponsor money and also does not include the UFC's traditional "fight night" bonuses. The total disclosed payroll for the event was $3,331,000.
Jon Jones: $500,000 (no win bonus) def. Thiago Santos: $350,000
Amanda Nunes: $500,000 (includes $200,000 win bonus) def. Holly Holm: $300,000
Jorge Masvidal: $200,000 (includes $100,000 win bonus) def. Ben Askren: $210,000
Jan Błachowicz: $92,000 (includes $46,000 win bonus) def. Luke Rockhold: $200,000
Michael Chiesa: $104,000 (includes $52,000 win bonus) def. Diego Sanchez: $103,000
Arnold Allen: $64,000 (includes $32,000 win bonus) def. Gilbert Melendez: $200,000
Marlon Vera: $96,000 (includes $48,000 win bonus) def. Nohelin Hernandez: $12,000
Cláudia Gadelha: $102,000 (includes $52,000 win bonus) def. Randa Markos: $30,000
Song Yadong: $90,000 (includes $45,000 win bonus) def. Alejandro Pérez: $42,000
Edmen Shahbazyan: $32,000 (includes $16,000 win bonus) def. Jack Marshman: $30,000
Chance Recountre: $28,000 (includes $14,000 win bonus) def. Ismail Naurdiev: $14,000
Julia Avila: $20,000 (includes $10,000 win bonus) def. Pannie Kianzad: $12,000

See also 

 List of UFC events
 2019 in UFC
 List of current UFC fighters

References 

Ultimate Fighting Championship events
2019 in mixed martial arts
Mixed martial arts in Las Vegas
2019 in sports in Nevada
July 2019 sports events in the United States
Events in Paradise, Nevada